The monarchs of Nepal were members of the Shah dynasty who ruled over the Kingdom of Nepal from 1743 to its dissolution in 2008. However, from 1846 until the 1951 revolution, the country was de facto ruled by the hereditary prime ministers from the Rana dynasty, reducing the role of the Shah monarch to that of a figurehead. In November 1990, after the Jana Andolan movement, the new Constitution was adopted and the country became a constitutional monarchy. The monarchy was abolished on 28 May 2008 by the 1st Constituent Assembly and the country was declared a federal parliamentary republic, in the aftermath of the 2006 Loktantra Andolan movement.

Prithvi Narayan Shah ascended the throne of the Gorkha Kingdom in 1743 after the death of his father Nara Bhupal Shah. He founded Nepal after invading Nuwakot in 1744 which started the unification process of the present-day country of Nepal. Shah died on 11 January 1775 after ruling for over 31 years; by the end of his reign, he had won over Nuwakot, Makwanpur, and Nepal Valley. Upon Prithvi Narayan's death, his son Pratap Singh Shah was appointed as the king. He died prematurely at the age of 26 in 1777; on the same day, his young son, Rana Bahadur Shah, became king with his mother, Queen Rajendra, and later his uncle, Bahadur Shah, as regent. Later Rana Bahadur abdicated the throne and his illegitimate son Girvan Yuddha Bikram Shah became the king.  During the reign of Girvan, the Anglo-Nepalese War broke out, which ended with the signing of the Treaty of Sugauli in 1816, resulting in Nepal losing a third of its territory. The king died on 20 November 1816 after contracting smallpox. Rajendra Bikram Shah succeeded his father at the age of three under the regency of his step-grandmother Queen Lalita Tripura Sundari Devi and Prime Minister Bhimsen Thapa. He declared that he would rule Nepal only with the advice of Rajya Lakshmi Devi and handed her all of his powers which led to the Kot massacre in 1846. After the massacre, Jung Bahadur Rana rose to power and de facto ruled the country and started the Rana dynasty who ruled the country for over a century.  The next year, Rajendra was imprisoned by Jung Bahadur at Hanuman Dhoka and his son Surendra Bikram Shah ascended the throne. His powers were limited; he died in 1881, three years after his eldest son, Trailokya. Surendra's grandson Prithvi Bir Bikram Shah became the king, but like his grandfather, he did not have many powers. Prithvi died prematurely at the of 36 and his five-year-old son, Tribhuvan, succeeded him.

In 1950, Tribhuvan went into exile at the Indian Embassy in a campaign aimed at removing the Ranas from power, in response Gyanendra, grandson of Tribhuvan was named the new king of Nepal by the Rana government. Tribhuvan returned to Nepal after a mutual agreement between Ranas (which ended the Ranas rule) and was crowned the king again in 1951. Upon Tribhuvan's death, Mahendra became king in 1955. In 1960, he began the party-less political system, Panchayat. During a hunting event, he suffered a heart attack, and his son Birendra assumed the throne in 1975, two years after his father's death. In 1990, pro-democracy riots broke out in Nepal, resulting in the country becoming a constitutional monarchy. On 1 June 2001, the Nepalese royal family were killed in a mass shooting, including the king, and the government named Birendra's son Dipendra as the perpetrator. Dipendra went into a coma after shooting himself and was declared king while in the coma; he died in hospital three days later. His uncle Gyanendra was crowned again and his reign saw the growing insurgency of the Nepalese Civil War. In 2008, Gyanendra stepped down as the king of Nepal and the country became the Federal Democratic Republic of Nepal.

Monarchs

Timeline

References

Notes

Citations

Nepalese monarchs
Monarchs
Nepal
Monarchs